James Hays may refer to:
 James B. Hays (1840–1888), American legislator and jurist
 James D. Hays, professor of earth and environmental sciences
 James H. Hays (1800–1876), American pioneer of bituminous coal mining

See also
 James Hayes (disambiguation)
 James Hay (disambiguation)